WMEQ-FM (92.1 MHz, Classic Rock 92.1) is a radio station  broadcasting a classic rock format. Licensed to Menomonie, Wisconsin, United States, the station serves the Eau Claire area.  The station is owned by iHeartMedia, Inc. and carries the nationally syndicated radio program Bob & Tom.

References

External links

MEQ-FM
Classic rock radio stations in the United States
Radio stations established in 1967
IHeartMedia radio stations